Jews have lived in France since Roman times, with a rich and complex history. In the Middle Ages, French kings expelled most of the original Ashkenazi Jewish population to Germany. Since the French Revolution (and Emancipation), Jews have been able to contribute to all aspects of French culture and society. Moreover, the Cremieux decree gave in 1870 the full French citizenship to North-African Jews, living in the Maghreb under French colonization. During World War II, a significant number of Jews living in Metropolitan France were murdered in the Holocaust, deported to Nazi death camps by the French Vichy government. After 1945, France served as a haven for Askhenazi refugees, then after the independence of Morocco, Tunisia and the end of Algerian War, an influx of immigration of Sephardi Jews saw the Jewish population triple to around 600,000, making it the largest Jewish community in Western Europe. Behind the United States and Israel, France ranks 3rd by Jewish population. In 2019, the Jewish Agency evaluated the Jewish population in France to be 450,000, not mentioning French citizens with only one Jewish parent or grandparent.

The following is a list of some prominent Jews and people of Jewish origins, among others (not all of them practice, or practiced, the Jewish religion) who were born in, or are very strongly associated with, France. The French nationality law itself, strongly secular, forbids any statistics or lists based on ethnic or religious membership.

Historical figures

Activists
 René Cassin (1887–1976), drafted the Universal Declaration of Human Rights, won Nobel Peace Prize (1968)
 Lewis Goldsmith (c. 1763–1846), English-born journalist and political writer
 Alain Krivine (born 1941), student leader and Trotskyist MEP
 André Spire (1868–1966), lawyer, journalist, poet, Jewish society and French Zionism leader

Clergymen
 Aaron ben Perez of Avignon, fl.1300–1310
 Abraham Auerbach (mid 1700s – November 3, 1846), Alsatian-born rabbi and liturgical poet. Fled France for Germany after imprisonment during the Reign of Terror.
 Gilles Bernheim (born 1952), chief rabbi of France 2009–2013
 Mordecai Karmi (1749–1825), rabbi and Talmudic writer
 Jean-Marie Lustiger (1926–2007), former Catholic archbishop of Paris and cardinal; converted to Catholicism when he was 13
 Rashi (1040–1105), medieval rabbi based in Troyes, famed as the author of the first comprehensive commentary on the Talmud, as well as a comprehensive commentary on the Tanakh (Hebrew Bible)
 Joseph Sitruk (born 1944), Tunisian-born former Chief Rabbi of France, 1987–2008
 Rabbeinu Tam (1100–1171), rabbinical authority, grandson of Rashi

Military
 Denise Bloch (1915–1945), World War II SOE spy
 Nissim de Camondo (1892–1917), pilot in World War I
 Alfred Dreyfus (1859–1935), military officer
 Robert Gamzon, French resistant, commanding the 2nd company of Maquis de Vabre
 Alter Mojze Goldman (1909–1988), Polish-born, active during the French Résistance; father of Jean-Jacques Goldman, Robert Goldman and Pierre Goldman
 Paulette Weill Oppert (1911–2005), Second World War resistance fighter

Nobles
 Cahen d'Anvers, Papal title of 1867
 Liefmann Calmer, Baron of Picquigny and Viscount of Amiens
 d'Estienne, one of the early Franco/Jewish ennoblements in 16th-century Provence, after the family converted to Catholicism and changed their name from Cohen to Estienne in 1501
 Maurice Ephrussi, Russian Empire-born, husband of Beatrice de Rothschild
 de Fould-Springer, Baron Eugène Fould-Springer
Arnaud Henry Salas-Perez, Prince Obolensky (1982-), French born fashion editor and Designer, half Jewish.
 Koenigswarter
 de Rothschild

Philanthropists
 Angelo Donati (1885–1960), Italian-born, from 1919 to 1960, saved the Jews from Nazi persecution in the Italian-occupied France between 1942 and 1943 while staying in Nice

Politicians
 Jacques Attali (born 1943), Algerian-born advisor to President François Mitterrand from 1981 to 1991
 Robert Badinter (born 1928), Justice minister, 1981–86; abolished the death penalty in France
 Patrick Balkany (born 1948), member of the National Assembly of France
 Léon Blum (1872–1950), Prime Minister, 1936–37, 1938, and 1946–47
 Élisabeth Borne (born 1961), Jewish father, first woman of Jewish dissent to serve as Prime Minister, serving since 2022. 
 Agnès Buzyn (born 1962), medical doctor and university professor, Minister of Health from 2017–2020
 Daniel Cohn-Bendit (born 1945), French-born German politician, active in both countries, best known as leader of the 1968 student uprising in France; more recently a leader of the European Greens
 Jean-François Copé (born 1964), President of the Union for a Popular Movement (UMP) Group in the French National Assembly
 Adolphe Crémieux (1796–1880), Justice Minister, 1848, 1870–71
 Julien Dray (born 1955), Algerian-born member of the National Assembly of France for the Socialist Party (PS)
 Michel Debré (1912–1996), Prime Minister
 Léon Halévy (1802–1883), civil servant, historian, and dramatist; son of Élie Halévy, brother of Fromental Halévy and father of Ludovic Halévy and grandfather to Élie Halévy, Daniel Halévy and Lucien-Anatole Prévost-Paradol
 Roger Karoutchi (born 1951), Moroccan-born Secretary of State to the Prime Minister, with responsibility for Relations with Parliament
 Louis-Lucien Klotz (1868–1930), journalist and politician; Minister of Finance during World War I
 Bernard Kouchner (born 1939), Minister of Foreign Affairs (2007–2010) and physician,.co-founder of NGO's Médecins Sans Frontières and Médecins du Monde
 Henri Krasucki (1924–2003), Polish-born former secretary general of the Confédération générale du travail (CGT) from 1982 to 1992
 Jack Lang (born 1939), Minister of Culture (1981–1986, 1988–1993) and Minister of Education (1992–1993, 2000–2002)
 Pierre Lellouche (born 1951), Tunisian-born member of the Union for a Popular Movement (UMP) party
 Georges Mandel (1885–1944), Interior Minister, 1939
 René Mayer (1895–1972),  Prime Minister
 Pierre Mendès France (1907–1982), Prime Minister, 1954–55; withdrew from Indochina
 Alexandre Millerand  (1859–1943), first Jewish Prime Minister, 1920, and first Jewish President of France, serving 1920 to 1924 
 Jules Moch (1893–1985), Transport Minister, 1945–47; Interior Minister, 1947–50; Defense Minister, 1950–51
 Pierre Moscovici (born 1957), European Union Economic Affairs Commissioner, former French Finance Ministerer and member of the French Parliament for the Socialist Party (PS)
 Yaël Braun-Pivet (born 1970), Jewish grandparents, first practicing Jew, as well as woman, to serve as President of the French National Assembly, serving since 2022.
 Maurice Schumann (1911–1998), Minister of Foreign Affairs (1969–1973), Jewish father
 Alexandre Stavisky (1886–1934), Ukrainian-born financier and embezzler; Stavisky Affair
 Abraham Schrameck (1867–1948), Minister of the Interior, and colonial governor of French Madagascar, senator.
 Dominique Strauss-Kahn (born 1949), Finance Minister, 1997–99; President of the International Monetary Fund, 2007–11
 Simone Veil (1927–2017), Health Minister, 1974–76; legalized abortion; President of the European Parliament, 1979–82
 Georges Wormser (1888–1978), chief of staff of Prime Minister Georges Clemenceau
 Éric Zemmour (born 1958), French far-right politician, political journalist, essayist and 2022 French presidential election candidate

Journalists
 Paul Amar (born 1950), journalist and television presenter
 Michel Drucker (born 1942), journalist and TV host
 Erik Izraelewicz (1954–2012), journalist and author, specialised in economics and finance; director and editorial executive of the daily Le Monde
 Ruth Elkrief (born 1960), journalist and television presenter
 Jean-François Kahn (born 1938), founder of Marianne magazine
 Ariel Wizman (born 1962), Moroccan-born TV journalist, DJ, musician and stage actor

Academic figures

Scientists
 Hippolyte Bernheim (1840–1919), hypnosis pioneer
 Georges Charpak (1924–2010), Polish-born, Nobel Prize in physics in 1992
 Claude Cohen Tannoudji (born 1933), Nobel Prize in physics in 1997
 Serge Haroche (born 1944), Nobel Prize in physics in 2012
 François Jacob (1920–2013), Nobel Prize in medicine in 1965
 Gabriel Lippmann (1845–1921), Luxembourgish-born physicist, Nobel Prize (1908)
 Andre Michael Lwoff (1902–1994), microbiologist, Nobel Prize (1965)

Mathematicians
 Immanuel Bonfils (c. 1300 – 1377), mathematician and astronomer
 Maurice Block (1816–1901), German-born statistician
 Paul Lévy, mathematician specialized in probability theory
 Benoit Mandelbrot (1924–2010), Polish-born mathematician
 Olinde Rodrigues (1795–1851), mathematician and social reformer
 Laurent Schwartz (1915–2002), mathematician
 Andre Weil (1906–1998), mathematician and leader in the Bourbaki group

Social scientists
 Albert Aftalion (1874–1956), Bulgarian-born French economist
 Raymond Aron (1905–1983), sociologist
 Jacqueline Lévi-Valensi (1932-2004), specialist in the work of Albert Camus
 Élisabeth Badinter (born 1944), sociologist, philosopher and historian
 Julien Benda (1867–1956), philosopher and novelist
 Berachyah (12th or 13th century), philosopher
 Henri Bergson (1859–1941), philosopher, Nobel Prize (1927)
 Danielle Bleitrach (born 1938), sociologist, academic and journalist
 Marc Bloch (1886–1944), historian and Resistance leader
 Hélène Cixous (born 1937), Algerian-born feminist critic
 Jacques Derrida (1930–2004), Algerian-born philosopher
 Émile Durkheim (1858–1917), sociologist
 Josy Eisenberg (1933–2017), author, TV host, rabbi, screenwriter
 Alain Finkielkraut (born 1949), essayist
 Gersonides (1288–1344), philosopher
 Pierre Goldman (1944–1977), philosopher, author, thief; was mysteriously assassinated; son of Alter Mojze Goldman; half-brother to Robert Goldman and Jean-Jacques Goldman (half Jewish)
 Jean Gottmann (1915–1994), Russian Empire-born geographer
 Daniel Halévy (1872–1962), historian; son of Ludovic Halévy, brother to Élie Halévy, grandson of Élie Halévy, half brother to Lucien-Anatole Prévost-Paradol
 Claude Lévi-Strauss (1908–2009), cultural anthropologist and ethnologist
 Emmanuel Lévinas (1906–1995), Russian Empire-born philosopher
 Bernard-Henri Lévy (born 1948), Algerian-born philosopher
 Serge Moscovici (1925–2014), Romanian-born social psychologist, currently the director of the Laboratoire Européen de Psychologie Sociale; father of Pierre Moscovici
 Salomon Reinach (1858–1932), historian and archaeologist
 Maxime Rodinson (1915–2004), historian
 Jacob Rodrigues Pereira (1715–1780), first to teach the deaf
 Ignacy Sachs (born 1927), Polish-born economist
 George Steiner (1929-2020), literary critic
 Simone Weil (1909–1943), philosopher and mystic

Cultural figures

Artists
 Antoine Samuel Adam-Salomon (1818–1881), photographer and sculptor
 Christian Boltanski (1944–2021), photographer, sculptor and installation artist (half Jewish)
 Claude Cahun (1894–1954), photographer
 André François (1915–2005), cartoonist
 Marcel Gotlib (1934–2016), comics artist
 Michel Kikoine (1892–1968), Russian Empire-born painter
 Moise Kisling (1891–1953), Polish-born painter
 Camille Pissarro (1830–1903), Danish West Indies-born painter widely considered the "father of Impressionism"
 Willy Ronis (1910–2009), photographer
 Joann Sfar (born 1971), cartoonist, film director
 Chaïm Soutine (1893–1943), Belarusian-born painter
 Roland Topor (1938–1997), illustrator, novelist
 Pauline Trigère (1909–2002), fashion designer
 Ossip Zadkine (1890–1967), Russian-born sculptor (half Jewish)

Film and stage
 Anouk Aimée (born 1932), actress
 Alexandre Aja (born 1978), film director (Haute Tension)
 Mathieu Amalric (born 1965), actor, film director (half Jewish)
 Richard Anconina (born 1953), actor
Alexandre Arcady (born 1947), film director, scriptwriter
 Arthur (born 1966), Moroccan-born TV producer, TV host
Aure Atika (born 1970), actress, writer and director
Yvan Attal (born 1965), Israeli-born filmmaker, actor
Jean-Pierre Aumont (1911–2001), actor
Guy Béart (1930–2015), Egyptian-born singer and songwriter
Emmanuelle Béart (born 1963), actress (half Jewish), daughter of Guy Béart
Véra Belmont (born 1938), film producer, director and screenwriter
Maurice Benichou (born 1943), actor
Raymond Bernard (1891–1977), film director and screenwriter, son of Tristan Bernard and brother of Jean-Jacques Bernard
Sarah Bernhardt (1844–1923), stage actress (half Jewish)
Claude Berri (1934–2009), film director, producer, actor and writer
Simone Bitton (born 1955), Moroccan-born French-Israeli documentary filmmaker
Michel Boujenah (born 1952), Tunisian-born humorist, actor, producer, director
Pierre Braunberger (1905–1990), film producer
Alain Chabat (born 1958), actor, writer, director
David Charvet (born 1972), French-born actor and singer (Baywatch) (half Jewish)
Elie Chouraqui (born 1953), film director, producer, scriptwriter, actor
Gerard Darmon (born 1948), actor, singer
Charles Denner (1926–1995), Polish-born actor
Marcel Dalio (1900–1983), actor
Pascal Elbé (born 1967), actor
Gad Elmaleh (born 1971), Moroccan-born humorist, actor, film director, singer, brother of Arié
Daniel Emilfork (1924–2006), Chilean-born actor
Jean Epstein (1897–1953), filmmaker, film theorist, literary critic, and novelist (half Jewish)
Sami Frey (born 1937), actor, director, movie actor
Charlotte Gainsbourg (born 1971), actress, singer (half Jewish); daughter of Serge Gainsbourg
Eva Green (born 1980), actress (half Jewish), daughter of Marlène Jobert
Roger Hanin (1925–2015), actor, director
Serge Hazanavicius (born 1963), actor
Michel Hazanavicius (born 1967), film director, screenwriter, and producer
Anna Held (1872–1918), Polish-born actress
Isabelle Huppert (born 1953), actress (half Jewish)
Agnès Jaoui (born 1964), director and actress
Marlène Jobert (born 1940), actress, author, singer; mother of Eva Green
Elie Kakou (1960–1999), humorist, actor
Marin Karmitz (born 1938), Romanian-born producer
Tcheky Karyo (born 1953), film actor
Mathieu Kassovitz (born 1967), film director, actor, producer (half Jewish), son of Peter Kassovitz
Peter Kassovitz (born 1938), Hungarian-born film director and scriptwriter
Sandrine Kiberlain (born 1968), actress
Cédric Klapisch (born 1961), film director
Diane Kurys (born 1948), filmmaker and actress
Arlette Langmann (born 1946); film editor and screenwriter; sister of Claude Berri
Greg Lansky (born 1982), pornographic film producer
Claude Lanzmann (1925–2018), filmmaker
Mélanie Laurent (born 1983), actress, singer, director
Claude Lelouch (born 1937), director
Gilles Lellouche (1972), actor (half Jewish)
Marcel Marceau (1923–2007), mime artist
Jean-Pierre Melville (1917–1973), film director and screenwriter
Radu Mihăileanu (born 1958), Romanian-born film director, screenwriter, poet
Claude Miller (1942–2012), director
Serge Moati (born 1958), Tunisian-born film director, screenwriter, journalist, artist, political consultant
Jean-Pierre Mocky (1929–2019), film director, screenwriter and actor
Marcel Ophüls (born 1927), German-born documentary filmmaker, son of Max Ophüls
Max Ophüls (1902–1957), German-born film director, father of Marcel Ophüls
Gérard Oury (1919–2006), film director, screenwriter; father of Danièle Thompson
Roman Polanski (born 1933), film director, screenwriter, actor (three-fourths Jewish)
Rachel (1821–1858), Swiss-born stage actress
Éric Rochant (born 1961), film director and screenwriter.
Alexandra Rosenfeld (born 1986), Miss France 2006
Ida Rubinstein (1885–1960), Russian-born Belle Epoque icon
Suzanne Schiffman (1929–2001), screenwriter, film director (half Jewish)
Simone Signoret (1921–1985), German-born actress (half Jewish)
Tomer Sisley (born 1974), German-born actor and comedian
Estelle Skornik (born 1971), actress
Nicole Stéphane (1923–2007), film producer, actress, and director
Charlotte Szlovak (born 1947), Moroccan-born cinematographer, film director, and screenwriter
Danièle Thompson (born 1942), film director, screenwriter (half Jewish); daughter of Gérard Oury
Alexandre Trauner (1906–1993), Hungarian-born Academy Award winning Scenic designer
Michael Vartan (born 1968), actor (half Jewish)
Francis Veber (born 1937), film director, playwright and screenwriter (half Jewish)
André Weinfeld (born 1947), film and television producer, director, screenwriter, photographer and journalist
William Wyler (1902–1981), film director
Yolande Zauberman, film director and screenwriter
Elsa Zylberstein (born 1968), actress (half Jewish)

Musicians
Charles-Valentin Alkan (1813–1888), composer and pianist
Franck Amsallem (born 1961), Algerian-born jazz pianist and composer
Monique Andrée Serf (1930–1997), French singer known as Barbara
Keren Ann (born 1974), Israeli-born folk singer
Thomas Bangalter (born 1975), French musician known as half of the electro duo Daft Punk
Patrick Bruel (born 1959), singer, musician, actor
Marcel Dadi (1951–1996), guitarist
Joe Dassin (1938–1980), American-born singer, son of Jules Dassin
Mike Brant (1947–1975), singer
Natalie Dessay (born 1965), opera singer soprano (converted to Judaism)
Sacha Distel (1933–2004), singer, guitarist
Paul Dukas (1865–1935), composer
Jean Ferrat (1930–2010), singer-songwriter, poet
Serge Gainsbourg (1928–1991), singer-songwriter, musician, film composer, actor, film director, writer; father of Charlotte Gainsbourg
Jean-Jacques Goldman (born 1951), singer, songwriter, musician; son of Alter Mojze Goldman, brother to Robert Goldman and half-brother to Pierre Goldman
 David Guetta (born 1967), DJ, remixer, songwriter
Fromental Halévy (1799–1862), composer
Ludovic Halévy (1834–1908), librettist; son of Élie Halévy
Jenifer (born 1982), French pop singer (half Jewish)
Joseph Kosma (1905–1969), Hungarian-born film composer
Norbert Krief (born 1956), guitarist
Jacques Lanzmann (1927–2006), lyricist; brother of Claude Lanzmann
Isidore de Lara (1858–1930), English-born composer
René Leibowitz (1913–1972), Polish-born composer
Daniel Levi (born 1961), singer, composer
Enrico Macias (born 1938), Algerian-born singer, guitarist
Emmanuelle Haïm (born 1967), harpsichordist and conductor (half Jewish)
Darius Milhaud (1892–1974), composer, member of the Groupe des six
Pierre Monteux (1875–1964), conductor
Georges Moustaki (1934–2013), Egyptian-born composer, singer
Yael Naim (born 1978), singer-songwriter, guitarist
Jacques Offenbach (1819–1880), German-born composer
Catherine Ringer (born 1957), singer, songwriter, actress
Sapho (born 1950), Moroccan-born singer
 David Serero (born 1981), French opera singer, actor, producer; his parents are Sephardi Jews from Morocco
Martial Solal (born 1927), jazz pianist and composer
Tal (born 1989), Israeli-born pop / R'n'B singer
Alexandre Tansman (1897–1986), Polish-born composer, pianist
Daniel Vangarde (born 1947), French songwriter and producer, father of Thomas Bangalter
Émile Waldteufel (1837–1915), composer

Writers and poets
 Tristan Bernard (1866–1947), playwright and novelist, father of Raymond Bernard and Jean-Jacques Bernard
 Jean-Jacques Bernard (1888–1974), playwright, son of Tristan Bernard and brother of Raymond Bernard
 Henri Bernstein (1876–1953), playwright
 Henri Blowitz (1825–1903), Bohemian-born journalist
 Paul Celan (1920–1970), Romanian-born poet
 Benjamin Fondane (1898–1944), Romanian-born poet
 Romain Gary (1914–1980), Russian Empire-born novelist
 René Goscinny (1926–1977), comic book author and editor, co-creator of Asterix
 Élie Halévy (1760–1826), Bavarian-born French Hebrew poet, author and secretary of the Jewish community of Paris; father of Fromental Halévy and Léon Halévy
 Marek Halter (born 1936), writer and activist
 Léon Hollaenderski (1808–1878), writer and poet
 Max Jacob (1876–1944), poet
 Edmond Jabès (1912–1991), Egyptian-born poet
 Joseph Joffo (born 1931), writer
 Gabriel Josipovici (born 1940), novelist
 Gustave Kahn (1859–1936), poet and art critic
 Joseph Kessel (1898–1979), Argentinian-born novelist and journalist
 Justine Lévy (born 1974), novelist, daughter of Bernard-Henri Lévy
 André Maurois (1885–1967), author
 Alain Mamou-Mani (born 1949), Tunisian-born French film producer and writer
 Albert Memmi (1920-2020), Tunisian-born novelist and sociologist
 Catulle Mendès (1841–1909), poet and man of letters (half Jewish)
 Patrick Modiano (born 1945), writer (half Jewish)
 Nine Moati (born 1938), Tunisian-born novelist Les Belles de Tunis and screenwriter; sister of Serge Moati
 Irène Némirovsky (1903–1942), writer
 Georges Perec (1936–1982), novelist
 Marcel Proust (1871–1922), writer
 Yasmina Reza (born 1959), playwright
 Nathalie Sarraute (1900–1999), Russian-born writer
 Jean-Jacques Schuhl (born 1941), writer
 Anne Sinclair (born 1948), political journalist; wife of Dominique Strauss-Kahn
 André Suarès (1868–1948), poet
 Elsa Triolet (1896–1970), Russian-born novelist
 Tristan Tzara (1896–1963), Romanian-born poet
 Ilarie Voronca (1903–1946), Romanian-born poet and essayist
 Bernard Werber (born 1961), best-selling author

Business figures
 Marcel Bleustein-Blanchet (1906–1996), founder and head of Publicis Groupe
 Moïse de Camondo (1860–1935), Ottoman Empire-born banker
 Isaac and Daniel Carasso, founders of Danone
 André Citroën (1878–1935), founder of Citroën
 Marcel Dassault (1892–1986), aerospace industrialist; converted to Catholicism in 1950
 Achille Fould (1800–1867), financier
 Maurice Girodias (1919–1990), founder of Olympia Press (half Jewish)
 Maurice de Hirsch (1831–1896), banker
 Philippe Kahn (born 1952), founder of Borland
 Gérard Louis-Dreyfus (1932–2016), owner of Louis-Dreyfus & Co. (half Jewish)
 Michel Adam Lisowski (born 1950), Polish-born founder and president of Fashion TV
 André Meyer (1898–1979), French-American financier
 Emile and Isaac Péreire, bankers
 Rothschild banking and wine growing family of France

Sport figures

 Sarah Abitbol (born 1975), figure skater, World Figure Skating Championship bronze
 Gary Assous (born 1988), football player 
 Jonathan Assous (born 1983), France/Israel, soccer defensive midfielder (Hapoel Ramat Gan)
 Fabrice Benichou (born 1966), boxer, World Champion, super bantamweight
 Cyril Benzaquen (born 1989), World Champion Kickboxing, World Champion Muay-thaï, light heavyweight 
 Ossip Bernstein (1882–1962), Russian-born chess grandmaster
 Jean Bloch (born 1877), soccer, Olympic silver
 Ilan Boccara (born 1993), France/Netherlands, football player 
 Alain Calmat (born 1940), figure skater, Olympic silver, World Championship gold, silver, two-time bronze
 François Cevert (1944–1973), racing driver (half Jewish)
 Robert Cohen (1930–2022), boxer, World Champion, bantamweight
 Stéphanie Cohen-Aloro (born 1983), tennis player
 Steven Cohen (born 1986), football player 
 Pierre Darmon (born 1934), tennis player, highest world ranking #8
 René Dreyfus (1905–1993), racing driver
 Yves Dreyfus (1931–2021), épée fencer, Olympic bronze, French champion
 Johann Fauveau (born 1982), kickboxer, World Champion, welterweight
 Myriam Fox-Jerusalmi (born 1961), slalom canoer, Olympic bronze (K-1 slalom), five golds at ICF Canoe Slalom World Championships (two-time K-1, three-time K-1 team)
 Stéphane Haccoun (born 1967), boxer, featherweight, super featherweight, and junior lightweight
 Rudy Haddad (born 1985), soccer midfielder (LB Châteauroux & U21 national team)
 Alphonse Halimi (1932–2006), boxer, World Champion, bantamweight
 Maurice Herzog (1919–2012), mountaineer; first 8000 m; mountain Annapurna (1950); later a politician
 Alexandre Lippmann (1881–1960), épée fencer, two-time Olympic champion, two-time silver, bronze
 Armand Mouyal (1925–1988), épée fencer, Olympic bronze, world champion
 Alfred "Artem" Nakache (1915–1983), swimmer; world record (200-m breaststroke), one-third of French two-time world record (3x100 relay team); imprisoned by Nazis in Auschwitz, where his wife and daughter were killed
 Claude Netter (1924–2007), foil fencer, Olympic champion, silver
 Jacques Ochs (1883–1971), French-born Belgian épée, saber, and foil fencer, Olympic champion
 Kevin Pariente (born 1987), football player 
 Maxime Partouche (born 1990), football player 
 Victor Perez (1911–1945), Tunisian-French boxer, World Champion, flyweight; murdered in the Holocaust
 François Rozenthal (born 1975), ice hockey, France national team; brother of Maurice Rozenthal
 Maurice Rozenthal (born 1975), ice hockey, right wing, France national team
 Eric Sitruk (born 1978), football player 
 Jean Stern (1875–1962), épée fencer, Olympic champion
 Daniel Wildenstein (1917–2001), racehorse owner

Other
 Abraham of Aragon, Jewish physician specializing in diseases of the eye
 Bonet de Lattes (by 1450-after 1514), astrologer and papal physician 
 Ilan Halimi (1982–2006), salesman; was kidnapped, tortured, and murdered by an anti-semitic gang thinking he was a wealthy man

See also
History of the Jews in France
List of French people
List of West European Jews

References

Footnotes

 
Lists of Jews by country
Jews
Jews,French